Kumkani (King) Jonguxolo Sandile "Aa! Vul'ulwandle!" (born 31 July 1992) is the King and ruler of the Rharhabe House of the Xhosa Kingdom.

Life 
His ascension was announced at his mother's funeral on 12 July 2020.

References

1992 births
Living people